Terblanche is a surname. Notable people with the surname include:

Claire Terblanche (born 1984), South African cricketer
Daleen Terblanche (born 1969), South African cricketer
De-Jay Terblanche (born 1985), South African rugby union footballer
Des Terblanche (born 1965), South African golfer
J. Terblanche, South African paralympic swimmer
Juanita Terblanche (born 1970), South African politician
Nicolene Terblanche (born 1988), South African field hockey player
Pierre Terblanche (born 1956), South African motorcycle designer
Terry Terblanche Botha (born 2004)
South African author
Romano Terblanche (born 1986), South African cricketer
Stefan Terblanche (born 1975), South African rugby union player